Brookula crebresculpta is a species of sea snail, a marine gastropod mollusk, unassigned in the superfamily Seguenzioidea.

References

crebresculpta